Anna (Anni) Maria Flinck (24 July 1915, Tampere - 23 June 1990) was a Finnish politician. She was a member of the Parliament of Finland from 1954 to 1975, representing the Social Democratic Party of Finland (SDP).

References

1915 births
1990 deaths
Politicians from Tampere
People from Häme Province (Grand Duchy of Finland)
Social Democratic Party of Finland politicians
Members of the Parliament of Finland (1954–58)
Members of the Parliament of Finland (1958–62)
Members of the Parliament of Finland (1962–66)
Members of the Parliament of Finland (1966–70)
Members of the Parliament of Finland (1970–72)
Members of the Parliament of Finland (1972–75)
20th-century Finnish women politicians
Women members of the Parliament of Finland